Joaquin Miller Park is a large open space park in the Oakland Hills owned and operated by the city of Oakland, California. It is named after early California writer and poet Joaquin Miller, who bought the land in the 1880s, naming it "The Hights" [sic], and lived in the house preserved as the Joaquin Miller House.

Park

In addition to building his home here and planting hundreds of trees, Joaquin Miller placed monuments to his various heroes on the property, including Moses, John C. Frémont, and Robert Browning and Elizabeth Barrett Browning. The monuments remain to this day.

The park's  are heavily wooded with coast redwoods, coast live oaks, and pines. Many of the trees were originally planted by Miller himself. The Oakland Hills location provides panoramic views of the San Francisco Bay area. The park features include miles of hiking, biking, and horseback riding trails, an off-leash dog area, a children's playground, an amphitheater, and picnic tables. The stairs below the "cascades" that flow from the Woodminister Amphitheater are actively used by fitness enthusiasts and weddings. The park is cared for by the Friends of Joaquin Miller Park coalition of users.

Flora in the park include pinkflower currant, evergreen huckleberry, creambush, and gooseberry. There are several picnic areas as well as walking trails in the park, including Sinawik Trail, Sunset Loop, Palos Colorados Trail, Chaparral Trail, and Cinderella Trail.

Amphitheater
Joaquin Miller Park contains the 2,000-seat Woodminster Amphitheater and Cascade, an outdoor amphitheater regularly used to stage both amateur and professional musicals and plays. For many years the Oakland Recreation Department put on popular productions of musical comedies there, three per summer, using mostly amateur performers. Starting in 1967, production of the summer musicals was taken over by the current management.

The Cascade is the amphitheater's waterfall feature built in 1941 and dedicated to California writers, still with flowing water. It was designed by Howard Gilkey, who also designed the Cleveland Cascade at Lake Merritt (now dry).

References

External links

City of Oakland, Joaquin Miller Park website
Woodminster Musicals website

Parks in Oakland, California
Parks in the San Francisco Bay Area
Amphitheaters in California
Outdoor theatres